In mathematics, the Rellich–Kondrachov theorem is a compact embedding theorem concerning Sobolev spaces. It is named after the Austrian-German mathematician Franz Rellich and the Russian mathematician Vladimir Iosifovich Kondrashov.  Rellich proved the L2 theorem and Kondrashov the Lp theorem.

Statement of the theorem

Let Ω ⊆ Rn be an open, bounded Lipschitz domain, and let 1 ≤ p < n. Set

Then the Sobolev space W1,p(Ω; R) is continuously embedded in the Lp space Lp∗(Ω; R) and is compactly embedded in Lq(Ω; R) for every 1 ≤ q < p∗. In symbols,

and

Kondrachov embedding theorem

On a compact manifold with  boundary, the Kondrachov embedding theorem states that if  and  then the Sobolev embedding

is completely continuous (compact).

Consequences

Since an embedding is compact if and only if the inclusion (identity) operator is a compact operator, the Rellich–Kondrachov theorem implies that any uniformly bounded sequence in W1,p(Ω; R) has a subsequence that converges in Lq(Ω; R). Stated in this form,  in the past the result was sometimes referred to as the Rellich–Kondrachov selection theorem, since one "selects" a convergent subsequence. (However, today the customary name is "compactness theorem", whereas "selection theorem" has a precise and quite different meaning, referring to set-valued functions).

The Rellich–Kondrachov theorem may be used to prove the Poincaré inequality, which states that for u ∈ W1,p(Ω; R) (where Ω satisfies the same hypotheses as above),

for some constant C depending only on p and the geometry of the domain Ω, where

denotes the mean value of u over Ω.

References

Literature 
 
 Kondrachov, V. I., On certain properties of functions in the space L p .Dokl. Akad. Nauk SSSR 48, 563–566 (1945).
 Leoni, Giovanni (2009). A First Course in Sobolev Spaces. Graduate Studies in Mathematics. 105. American Mathematical Society. pp. xvi+607. . MR 2527916. Zbl 1180.46001
 

Theorems in analysis
Sobolev spaces